Anugerah Industri Muzik (literally: "Music Industry Award"), commonly known by the acronym AIM, is an award ceremony which celebrates the Malaysian music industry. The award is organized by the Recording Industry Association of Malaysia (RIM) and was first held on 15 December 1993. It is Malaysia's equivalent of the Grammy awards. The award is not only focused on Malay-language music produced in Malaysia, but also English, Chinese, and Indian-language music. Separate awards were introduced for the latter two language music subcategories in 1999 and 2013 respectively. One of these, known as the AIM Chinese Music Awards, was held in 1999 and 2001 before encountering a twelve-year hiatus due to insufficient funds.)

The broadcaster of the award has been changed several times, varying between RTM, Media Prima, and Astro.

Since its introduction, the award has been held every year, with the exception of 1994 and 2015, due to changes in the month of the ceremony. The 2016-2018 edition of AIM was not held due to financial constraints.

Categories

During the first award ceremony in 1993, there were only ten categories. After the first award, the category for Best New Artist (Solo) was split into male and female categories, until 1999. Another category which existed until 1999 was Best New Artist (Group). Genre-specific best albums were introduced in 1995 and abolished in 2010 due to a declining number of albums released. The focus on Best Vocal Performance was changed from album to single in 2009. A Best Indonesian Album category was introduced in 1997, and was replaced by Best Malay Song Performed by a Foreign Artist in 2008 until 2013/2014. RIM has since added five new categories that recognize achievements by songs and music videos based on digital sales on all digital platforms. These new awards recognize significant contributions by record labels in the local music industry and provide opportunities to the public to be the jury through a new category, Best Malaysian Singer.

The current awards presented in Anugerah Industri Muzik are:

Main awards:
 Best Album (Album of the Year)
 Best Song (Song of the Year)

Performance awards:
 Best New Artiste
 Best Vocal Performance in a Song (Male)
 Best Vocal Performance in a Song (Female)
 Best Vocal Performance in a Song (Group)
 Best Duo/Collaboration Vocal Performance in a Song

Technical achievements awards:
 Best Album Cover
 Best Engineered Album
 Best Music Video
 Best Musical Arrangement in a Song

Best songs according to genres
 Best Pop Song
 Best Rock Song
 Best Hip Hop Song
 Best Ethnic Pop Song
 Best Nasyid Song
 Best Local English Song

Popularity awards
 Most Downloaded Song
 Most Streamed Song
 Most Viewed Official Music Video on YouTube
 Best Selling Ring Back Tones Song
 Best Malaysian Singer (The nominees are among the Best Vocal Performance in a Song (Male & Female) finalists)

Special awards
 Sri Wirama Award (for outstanding contributions to the Malaysian music industry)
 Kembara Award (for a Malaysian artist responsible for promoting Malaysian compositions outside the country; not awarded every year)

Past winners
As of 2016, unlike similar music awards in other countries, no artist has won Best Album and Best Song in the same year.

Best Album
Siti Nurhaliza has the most wins in this category with seven including one for her duet album, Seri Balas with Noraniza Idris, out of nine nominations. Faizal Tahir comes second with two wins.

Best Song
Since its inauguration, the award was only given to the writers (composers and lyricists) of the song, until the 2010/2011 edition, where the singer was decided to be among the recipients, hence they also received the trophy. Starting from the 2009 edition, the nominees of this category comprise the winners for Best Ethnic Pop Song, Best Hip Hop Song, Best Nasyid Song, Best Pop Song, and Best Rock Song. Beginning from 2012/2013 onward, the winner of the Best Local English Song was included in the Best Song nominee list.

Composer Azlan Abu Hassan is the current record holder for most wins, with four. In 2013/2014, the song "No More", a self-written song by singer SonaOne, became the first English-language song to be awarded this title.

Best Engineered Album (Best Album Recording)
As one of the original categories in AIM, this category focuses on the technical aspects and the quality of an album recording. The award is given to the sound engineer(s) and the recording artist.

Kembara Award

Notes

References

External links
 

Malaysian music awards
Malay-language music
Awards established in 1993